Deh-e Gheybi (also Romanized as Deh-e Gheybī and Deh Gheybī) is a village in Sarjam Rural District, Ahmadabad District, Mashhad County, Razavi Khorasan Province, Iran. At the 2006 census, its population was 1,007, in 267 families.

References 

Populated places in Mashhad County